Robert Burns is a bronze portrait statue of Robert Burns by John Steell. Four versions exist, in New York City (United States), Dundee (Scotland), London (England), and Dunedin (New Zealand).

New York statue

The memorial sculpture in Manhattan's Central Park was cast  and dedicated on 2 October 1880. It was the first statue of Burns to be erected outside Scotland and was a gift to the City of New York from Saint Andrew's Society of the State of New York and the Scottish-American community. For this sculpture Steell closely followed the portrait of Burns painted by Alexander Nasmyth in 1787. Seated on a tree stump with a quill pen in one hand, Burns looks up to heaven. He is thinking of his true love Mary Campbell, who died at an early age. It was to her that he had written the poem "To Mary in Heaven" inscribed on the scroll at his feet. 

The Scottish and English statues

The Dundee statue was unveiled only two weeks after the one in New York in 1880 and the third cast was erected on the Thames Embankment in London in 1884.

Dunedin statue

The Dunedin statue was the last of the set to be unveiled, on 24 May 1887. A statue of Burns was deemed relevant to the city, both because of the city's Scottish roots (it was founded by the Free Church of Scotland in 1848), and also because one of the city's founding fathers was Rev. Thomas Burns, a nephew of the poet.

In likeness, it is closest to the London statue. There had been discussion whether to place the statue in front of the railway station, but an elevated placement in The Octagon, the central plaza of Dunedin, was eventually chosen. The statue was unveiled by Miss Burns, a great-grand niece of Robert Burns. Speeches were given by former Governor and Premier of New Zealand Sir George Grey, and Richard Henry Leary, the Mayor of Dunedin. Cyril Croker, a solicitor who spent his teenage years in Dunedin, would say of the statue that: It was situated between the Cathedral and two hotels, and, true to his reputation, Burns had his back to the Cathedral, and his face to the pub.

Because of its placement on what is now known as the McMillan terrace, the statue is the backdrop to many public speeches. On 27 July 1988, the statue was registered by the New Zealand Historic Places Trust as a Category I heritage structure with reference number 2208.

See also
 List of Robert Burns memorials
 List of sculptures in Central Park

References

External links
 

1880 establishments in New York (state)
1880 establishments in Scotland
1880 sculptures
1884 establishments in England
1887 establishments in New Zealand
Bronze sculptures in London
Bronze sculptures in Central Park
Bronze sculptures in New Zealand
Bronze sculptures in Scotland
Cultural depictions of Robert Burns
Culture in Dundee
Culture in Dunedin
Monuments and memorials in London
Monuments and memorials in Manhattan
Monuments and memorials in Scotland
Heritage New Zealand Category 1 historic places in Otago
Outdoor sculptures in London
Outdoor sculptures in Manhattan
Outdoor sculptures in New Zealand
Outdoor sculptures in Scotland
Sculptures of men in New York City
Sculptures of men in New Zealand
Burns, Robert
Statues in England
Statues in New York City
Statues in New Zealand
Burns
The Octagon, Dunedin
Victoria Embankment
City of Westminster